The Heckler & Koch HK CAWS (Close Assault Weapon System) is a prototype automatic shotgun—designed as a combat shotgun—co-produced by Heckler & Koch and Winchester/Olin during the 1980s. It was Heckler & Koch's entry into the U.S military's Close Assault Weapon System program.

It is a 10-round, 12-gauge, bullpup shotgun with two firing modes: semi-auto and full-auto. The gun is fully ambidextrous.

Development
The development of the HK CAWS started in response to the JSSAP requirement for Repeating Hand-held Improved Non-rifled Ordnance (RHINO), which itself grew out of the  Special Operations Weapon (SOW) project. RHINO specified a magazine capacity of 10 rounds, a requirement for the new ammunition to be incompatible with commercial 12ga shotguns, that felt recoil to be no greater than a Remington 870P firing M162 or M257 buckshot cartridges and that the system provide penetration and incapacitation capability significantly better than M162 and M257. These cases were also capable of being loaded with 000 Buckshot or with flechettes. Olin, in support of HK's CAW, also offered a fléchette load, using twenty much smaller projectiles at a high velocity of approximately 

By the early 1980s the CAWS program had taken over from RHINO. The main goal of this program was to develop a new generation personal firearm, capable of firing high-impulse, multiple projectiles with effective range of 100–150 meters. Using multiple projectiles should increase the chances of hitting the target in combat. One of the teams entered in the CAWS race was Heckler & Koch Germany, coupled with Winchester Corp. United States. Heckler & Koch was responsible for developing a weapon, while Winchester was responsible for the development of new types of ammunition.

The resulting firearm designed around the Olin cartridges was the HK CAWS. With an outer casing of high impact plastic like HK's previous G11, the weapon was designed to reduce recoil through the use of an interior 'floating recoil system'. Despite the bullpup design, it was designed for ambidextrous use with ambidextrous fire selectors and safety levers and ejection converted from right to left by rotating the bolt head 180°. The chamber was configured to accept the proprietary belted cartridges as well as commercial 12ga rounds and the barrel could be fitted with a choke or choked barrel extension. The carry handle covers the cocking handle similar to the AR-10, and housed an optical sight which could be converted to a rail sight.

Although tested by the U.S. military, and beating out the AAI Corporation's, Pan Associates' and Atchisson's entries into the competition, the CAWS was canceled, and production, both military and civilian, has halted.

See also
 SCMITR - another product of the CAWS program from AAI
 AAI CAWS - another product of the CAWS program from AAI
 List of bullpup firearms
 List of shotguns
 List of individual weapons of the U.S. Armed Forces

References

External links

 Cartridge of the Month June 2006: 12 Gauge Close Assault Weapon System (CAWS)
 HKPRO: The CAW
 Modern Firearms
 Military Factory: Heckler & Koch HK CAWS

Abandoned military projects of the United States
Automatic shotguns
Bullpup shotguns
Flechette firearms
HK CAWS
Trial and research firearms